Sweden women's under-19 national floorball team is the national floorball team of Sweden. , the team was ranked third by the International Floorball Federation.

References 

Women's national under-19 floorball teams
Floorball